Yasavol or Yasavel may refer to:
 Yasavol, Charuymaq, East Azerbaijan Province
 Yasavel, Hashtrud, East Azerbaijan Province
 Yasavol, Markazi
 Yasavol, Zanjan